Hissi may refer to:

Hissi (album), a 1996 album by Circle
Hissi, Selu, a village in Parbhani district, Maharashtra, India